Pseudoswammerdamia is a genus of moths of the family Yponomeutidae.

Species
Pseudoswammerdamia apicella - Donovan, 1792 
Pseudoswammerdamia aurofinitella - Duponchel, 1842 
Pseudoswammerdamia combinella - Hübner, 1786 
Pseudoswammerdamia comptella - Hübner, 1796 

Yponomeutidae